Nobody Knows Anybody is a 1999 Spanish-French thriller film  directed by Mateo Gil, based on the novel by Juan Bonilla. It stars Eduardo Noriega and Jordi Mollá alongside Natalia Verbeke and Paz Vega.

Plot 
Amid the spectacular festivities of Holy Week in Seville, an aspiring novelist struggles with his work and pays his bills by composing crossword puzzles. A cryptic recording left on his answering machine demands that he include a certain word in a future puzzle and he becomes drawn into a spiraling tangle of mystery, danger, and confusion. Soon he is forced into participating in a real-life version of a computer game on the narrow streets of Seville with extremely high stakes for the entire city.

Cast

Production 
The film is a Spanish-French co-production by Maestranza Films, Sogecine, and DMVB Films, with the collaboration of the Andalusia Film Commission, Canal Sur, and Canal+. Shooting locations included Seville, Carmona, and Madrid.

Release 
Distributed by Warner Sogefilms, the film was theatrically released in Spain on 26 November 1999.

Accolades 

|-
| rowspan = "5" align = "center" | 2000 || rowspan = "5" | 14th Goya Awards || Best New Director || Mateo Gil ||  || rowspan = "5" | 
|-
| Best Special Effects || Raúl Romanillos, Manuel Horrillo, José Núñez, Emilio Ruiz del Río || 
|}

See also 
 List of Spanish films of 1999

References

External links 
 
 

1999 films
1999 thriller films
Films set in Seville
Films about games
Films about terrorism in Europe
Spanish thriller films
1990s Spanish films
1990s Spanish-language films
Sogecine films
Maestranza Films films
Films shot in the province of Seville
Films shot in Madrid
Films based on Spanish novels